Maritza Sayalero Fernández (born February 16, 1961 in Caracas) is a Venezuelan designer, model, businesswoman and beauty queen. In 1979, she was crowned both Miss Venezuela and Miss Universe, the first woman from Venezuela to win this title. She is married to retired tennis player Raúl Ramírez, with whom she has lived in Mexico since 1981.

Miss Venezuela
Sayalero competed in 1979 as Miss Departamento Vargas in her country's national beauty pageant, Miss Venezuela. She won the crown and the right to represent her country in the Miss Universe 1979 pageant.

Miss Universe
Sayalero showed enough of her legendary poise to become the leader of the night, winning the swimsuit, interview and evening gown competitions at the pageant held in Perth, Australia on July 19. She was the first titleholder from Venezuela.

Immediately after the live telecast ended, the stage collapsed, as too many journalists and photographers tried get a photograph of her. She managed to save a contestant (Miss Colombia) from falling into the gaping hole left in the middle of the set. Other delegates, including Miss Turkey and Miss Brazil, fell through the hole and were injured.

Legacy
Her victory began a national interest in beauty in Venezuela. Her name has become synonymous with beauty among Spanish-language speakers. Following her victory, many parents named their daughters Maritza after her, especially if they shared the common family surname of Fernandez.

Life after Miss Universe
Maritza Sayalero is married to tennis player Raúl Ramírez, and she became a naturalized citizen of Mexico. The couple have three children: Rebecca (born 1982), Raúl Alán (born 1984) and Daniel Francisco (1989).

Sayalero and her family live in Ensenada, Baja California. For years, she owned a boutique there where she sold her own designs.

References

External links
Miss Universe official history, including photograph
1970s Miss Universe winners, including photograph
 BellezaVenezolana.net

1961 births
Living people
Miss Universe 1979 contestants
Miss Universe winners
Miss Venezuela winners
Naturalized citizens of Mexico
People from Caracas
Venezuelan beauty pageant winners
Venezuelan emigrants to Mexico
Venezuelan female models